Zygaena sedi is a species of moth in the Zygaenidae family. It is found in Greece, Bulgaria, Turkey, Ukraine and Russia.
In Seitz it is described - Z. sedi  Fab. (6k). In this insect the spots of each pair are merged to large light red patches, these being separated from each other only by thin lines of the transparent ground-colour. Abdomen without belt. Coasts of the Black Sea.

Subspecies
Zygaena sedi sedi
Zygaena sedi dellabrunai Dujardin, 1981
Zygaena sedi sliwenensis Reiss, 1933

References

Moths described in 1787
Zygaena
Moths of Europe
Moths of Asia